Tułowice  is a town in Opole County, Opole Voivodeship, in south-western Poland. It is the seat of Gmina Tułowice. It is located within the historic region of Upper Silesia.

The town has a population of 4,011.

History
In the Middle Ages the settlement was under Polish rule, and then it was also part of Bohemia (Czechia), Prussia and Germany. During World War II, the Germans established and operated the E581 forced labour subcamp of the Stalag VIII-B/344 prisoner-of-war camp in the village. The village was restored to Poland after the defeat of Nazi Germany in World War II in 1945. In the 19th century it was also known in Polish as Tyłowice. For most of its history, Tułowice was a village, before it was granted town rights in 2017, with effect from 2018.

Transport
There is a train station, located on the Polish Railway Line No. 287 which connects Opole and Nysa.

Twin towns – sister cities
See twin towns of Gmina Tułowice.

Gallery

References

Cities and towns in Opole Voivodeship
Opole County